Velyki Korovyntsi is an urban-type settlement in Zhytomyr Raion, Zhytomyr Oblast, Ukraine. Population:  In 2001, population was 2,794.

References

Urban-type settlements in Zhytomyr Raion
Zhytomyr Raion
Zhitomirsky Uyezd